Bugle railway station serves the village of Bugle in Cornwall, England. All trains are operated by and the station is managed by Great Western Railway.

History

The first railway here was a horse-worked line from Par Harbour to "near the Bugle Inn" at Molinnis. It was built by Joseph Treffry and opened on 18 May 1847.

On 1 June 1874 a new line was opened by the Cornwall Minerals Railway. Running beyond Par to Fowey, and continuing past Molinnis to join up with another of Treffry's tramways to Newquay. A passenger service was introduced on 20 June 1876 when a station with a single platform on the north side of the line was provided at Bugle.

The line from Bugle eastwards to Goonbarrow Junction was doubled on 20 July 1930, with the new line passing behind the platform to create an island platform. From 29 November 1964 the original line was only used only for freight trains to reach the Carbis branch. This meant that all passenger trains now use the 1930 platform face. The Carbis branch closed on 25 August 1989 leaving just a single track through the station and all the way to Newquay, which sets the low frequency of train service which is possible on the branch.

Services
Bugle is a request stop on the line, so passengers wishing to alight must inform the conductor, and passengers wishing to join the train must signal to the driver. The typical service is one train every two hours in each direction between Par and Newquay, with some services extending to Plymouth and one train in the summer extending to Penzance. On summer Saturdays, there is just one train per day in each direction due to the intercity services running through to Newquay in lieu of the local services. Trains are usually operated by Class 150 Sprinters.

Community rail
The trains between Par and Newquay are designated as a community rail service and is supported by marketing provided by the Devon and Cornwall Rail Partnership. The line is promoted under the "Atlantic Coast Line" name. The Bugle Inn is part of the Atlantic Coast Line rail ale trail.

References

 
 
 

Railway stations in Cornwall
Former Great Western Railway stations
Railway stations in Great Britain opened in 1876
Railway stations served by Great Western Railway
Railway request stops in Great Britain
DfT Category F1 stations